Greg Coffey is an Australian hedge fund manager based in London. Nicknamed "The Wizard of Oz" during his time at GLG Partners and Moore Capital Management, in 2012 he declared retirement at the age of 41 and returned to Sydney. In early 2018, Coffey's plans to launch a new fund were announced.

Early life and education
Coffey attended St. Patrick's College, Strathfield, matriculating in 1988.

Coffey graduated with a Bachelor of Economics from Macquarie University in 1995.

Career
Coffey joined Macquarie Bank in 1993 and in 1994 traded emerging-market equity derivatives at Bankers Trust and Deutsche Bank AG. Coffey was hired by Blueborder Partners, a George Soros related hedge fund and was then hired by Bank Austria to oversee global equity proprietary trading.

Coffey was then a trader at GLG Partners (GLG), and is estimated to have earned 170 million in 2007 after increasing by 51% the value of his emerging markets fund. In April 2008 he announced his departure from GLG, effective in October, and leaving behind his 200 million GLG Partners compensation package. Industry sources estimated that Coffey had been responsible for two-thirds of GLG's performance fees during his time there. In November 2008 became co-chief investment officer of Moore Europe Capital Management, a subsidiary of Moore Capital Management. In October 2012, at the age of 41, he announced his retirement.

In December 2017, it was rumoured that Coffey would launch a new hedge fund. In February 2018, Kirkoswald Capital Partners was reported to have commitments from investors of 3.5 billion. The size of the new fund would be capped at 2 billion and offices will be headquartered in London.

Personal life
In November 2010 Coffey bought Ardfin Estate, a  sporting estate on the island of Jura in Scotland. The purchase attracted controversy and concern over Coffey's decision to close the estate's public gardens, whose 2,500 visitors a year formed a significant source of income for Jura. In 2011, a spokesperson for Coffey said that his "full intention" was to re-open the gardens during 2012, but the gardens have remained closed. Coffey constructed an 18-hole private golf course on the estate. The work was completed in 2018 and the course opened in spring 2019.

Wealth rankings

Notes 
 : Net worth drawn from the BRW Young Rich List

References

1971 births
Living people
Australian hedge fund managers
People from Sydney
Australian expatriates in the United Kingdom